Year 1387 (MCCCLXXXVII) was a common year starting on Tuesday (link will display the full calendar) of the Julian calendar.

Events

January–December 
 Elizabeta Kotromanic, mother of Mary, Queen of Hungary and the regent of Hungary, is murdered in prison by the Croatian rebels (her daughter is liberated on 4 June).

 January 1 – Charles III ascends to the throne of Navarre, after the death of his father, Charles II.
 January 5 – John I succeeds his father, Peter IV, as King of Aragon and Valencia, and forms an alliance with France and Castile.
 March 11 – Battle of Castagnaro: Padua, led by John Hawkwood, is victorious over Giovanni Ordelaffi of Verona.
 March 24–25 – Battle of Margate off the coast of Margate: The Kingdom of England is victorious over a Franco-Castilian-Flemish fleet.
 June 2 –  John Holland, a maternal half-brother of Richard II of England, is created Earl of Huntingdon.
 August 22 – Olaf, King of Norway and Denmark and claimant to the throne of Sweden, dies. The vacant thrones come under the regency of his mother Margaret I of Denmark, who will soon become queen in her own right.
 September 27 – Petru of Moldavia pays homage to Władysław II Jagiełło, making Moldavia a Polish fief (which it will remain until 1497).
 December 19 – Battle of Radcot Bridge: Forces loyal to Richard II of England are defeated by a group of rebellious barons known as the Lords Appellant. Richard II is imprisoned, until he agrees to replace all the councillors in his court.

Date unknown 
 Timur conquers the Muzaffarid Empire in central Persia, and appoints three puppet rulers.
 Khan Tokhtamysh of the Golden Horde invades the Timurid Empire, but has to withdraw soon after, due to heavy snow.
 Maghan II succeeds his brother, Musa II, as Mansa of the Mali Empire

Births 
 July 6 – Queen Blanche I of Navarre (d. 1441)
 date unknown – Henriette, Countess of Montbéliard, regent of Württemberg (d. 1444)

Deaths 
 January – Elizabeth of Bosnia, regent of Hungary
 January 1 – King Charles II of Navarre (b. 1332)
 January 6 – Peter IV of Aragon (b. 1319)
 July 20 – Robert IV of Artois, Count of Eu (poisoned) (b. 1356)
 July 22 – Frans Ackerman, Flemish statesman (b. 1330)
 August 23 – King Olaf IV of Norway/Olaf II of Denmark (b. 1370)
 date unknown 
 Richard Óg Burke, second Clanricarde of Ireland
 Sir David Hanmer, Welsh judge, father-in-law of Owain Glyndŵr

References